Camp Sovereignty is the name given to an Indigenous Australian protest movement established to publicise the "Black GST" political group. The "GST" reflects the group's aims of ending genocide, acknowledging sovereignty and securing a peace treaty.

On 12 March 2006 a camp was established and a ceremonial fire was lit in Kings Domain, a public park in Melbourne to symbolise the continuing presence of Indigenous culture in Australia. This camp was also used to protest against the Commonwealth Games, referred to by the protesters as the "Stolenwealth Games" in reference to the group's negative perceptions of the Commonwealth and their historical actions towards Indigenous Australians.

After the conclusion of the Commonwealth Games the central emphasis of the camp shifted towards the ceremonial fire. Robert Corowa, one of the leaders of the protest, argued that the fire was sacred because of the central place of fire in Aboriginal traditions and ceremony.

Under legal threat and the protest of over 100 people it was eventually quenched on 10 May 2006. However several sister fires have been lit in Redfern, Dandenong, and Framlingham to continue the protest.

These events have also guided future Australian protests such as the Camp Freedom rally on the Gold Coast during the 2018 Commonwealth Games. The events of Camp Sovereignty have also been sourced as inspiration for future Indigenous activists and leaders from this notable and large-scale protest.

Camp Sovereignty placed emphasis on maximising media coverage nationally and internationally to make Indigenous Australian civil rights issues criticised rigorously by the global population. Further commentary through the form of podcasts and documentaries have continued to promote and acknowledge the impacts of the Camp Sovereignty movement.

History 
Camp Sovereignty was borne from the Australian-based ‘Black GST Movement’ which campaigns for ending genocide (G), creating sovereignty (S), and making treaties (T) with Indigenous Australians. This movement originated in Melbourne in early 2005 by a group known as the Black GST political group.

The Black GST group were initially small and began publicising their message throughout 2005 in anticipation of the 2006 Commonwealth Games. The Camp Sovereignty protest was organised by the Black GST group and led by various well-known Indigenous activists including Marg Thorpe, Gary Foley and Robbie Thorpe, coordinating a predominantly young group of local Indigenous Australian activists.

The group advocated for increased recognition and campaigned against perceived injustices. Their stance was as follows: that Genocide G refers to the mass-slaughtering of Indigenous Australians in response to targeted massacres on Indigenous groups and the belief these have been overlooked in society. Sovereignty (S) refers to a perceived regime of oppression with the Indigenous voice silenced under Commonwealth law rather than adhering to Traditional Law. Treaties (T) refers to the lack of an established agreement with the Commonwealth and Indigenous Australians. Indigenous activists correlate these three dimensions back to the continued land rights disputes.

Indigenous activist Robbie Thorpe has a weekly podcast where he shares his ideologies and beliefs. In 2018, Thorpe dedicated an episode of this podcast to elaborate explicitly on the three components of Black GST. For example, one of Thorpe's arguments throughout the GST movement is their criticisms of Australia as being the ‘single Commonwealth country which does not have an established treaty with their respective Indigenous peoples’. This podcast collates and shares interviews and primary accounts from the founding members of the Black GST group and later Indigenous activists of the 21st Century.

Prior to Camp Sovereignty, the Black GST group began publicising their message and encouraging people to join their protest. Aside from the Indigenous Law Bulletin which encouraged Aboriginal activism in Australia, media outlets were not recognising the work and plans of the Black GST group. As the 2006 Commonwealth games set to open on 15 March 2006, the group began establishing the tents and crowds gathered for the event. Camp Sovereignty officially launched on 12 March 2006. With tents, a vocal group and various fires, it became clear this group would refuse to leave and the camp would remain. As this continued, the group were met with harsher criticism from the public and other Indigenous activities, along with legal threats from levels of government until it was inevitably shut down.

The main site of the protest at Kings Domain also holds significance in the organisation of Camp Sovereignty. In this park, the Indigenous Australians cherish the Kings Domain Resting Place which is a site specifically dedicated to deceased Victorian Indigenous Australians. Campaigners argued ‘the sacred site has been destroyed and ruined by many different groups’. The group thus chose Kings Domain as the central land to the protest as a symbol of historical mistreatment and disrespect.

The camp sovereignty protest at the Commonwealth Games resembles similar protests where sports and politics intersect. Protests such as the Brisbane 1982 Commonwealth Games protest and Sydney's 1988 Bicentennial Marches resemble the Camp Sovereignty protest and could be seen as inspiration for a successful protest at a major Australian sporting event.

Chronology

2005: Formation of the Black GST group 
The Black GST group is formed by a small group of activists in Melbourne early in 2005. The group consisted of various Indigenous and White activists with prominent figures including Robbie Thorpe, Marg Thorpe and Garry Foley. The group sought to publicise Indigenous civil rights issues and introduced their motives to end genocide, promote sovereignty and create treaties.

Early 2006: The 'Stolenwealth' Games 
Prior to the 2006 Melbourne Commonwealth Games (15/3/2006-26/3/2006), the Black GST group encouraged people to attend their planned protest which would commence three days prior to the start of the Commonwealth Games. The group encouraged activists to join them in the camp protesting for the duration of the Commonwealth Games. The group branded the Commonwealth Games as the ‘Stolenwealth Games’ in reference to the Stolen Generations and what the GST were terming Genocide. The group planned this initiative and invited activists throughout 2005 and early 2006 to best take advantage of the anticipated domestic and international media coverage. The group also pursued various events throughout the 2006 Commonwealth games including further protests and press events.

Throughout February and early March 2006, the Black GST group and Victorian authorities engaged in frequent non-conclusive discussion to ensure ‘the protest is manageable’ and is reasonable. These discussions combined with the government rejecting a cultural camp in Victoria Park, Collingwood had led the Black GST group to become increasingly vocal.

March 2006: The Commonwealth Games 
On 2 March 2006, the group launched the Camp Sovereignty website to publicise their message online to a global audience and share the significance of their sacred site.

The 2006 Commonwealth Games ran from the 15th to 26 March. On 12 March, the Camp Sovereignty movement was launched and the Black GST political group established a camp in Kings Domain, Melbourne. The group lit a fire in the public park to represent their cultural traditions in the heart of the events as a form of Indigenous recognition at a Commonwealth event. The group publicised this idea of the "Stolenwealth Games", rebranding the motto of the games: “united by the moment” with “divided by history”. Throughout the games, the fire ceremony and protest continued and gained increased attention from the public, media outlets and authorities.

The choice of occupying Kings Domain was contentious because it was classified as a “Games Management Zone.” According to the Commonwealth Games Arrangements Act 2001 these zones are under special restrictions including strict bans on any form of protesting or demonstrating. The organisers selected this location to draw attention to the demonstration due to its historical importance and its proximity to the Queen's residence.

Late March – Early May 2006: Post-Commonwealth Games 
Despite agreement to conclude the demonstration on 25 March, the group continued to occupy kings Domain beyond the Commonwealth Games events. After many disputes and legal issues the protest concluded on 10 May 2006.

Aftermath 
After refusing to close the camp on 25 March by declaring the site of the fire in kings Domain as sacred, the state government initiated legal action to stop the demonstration.

As the camp continued beyond the Games, it continued to gain attention from levels of Governments. The Victorian government initially chose to delegate responsibility to the City of Melbourne, claiming they would not involve themselves in this contentious debate. Australian Prime Minister at the time, John Howard also commented on the state of Camp Sovereignty throughout April 2006 as the protest continued. Prime Minister John Howard criticised Victorian authorities for their inaction drawing similarities to the issues of the Aboriginal Tent Embassy in Canberra which has remained from 1972.  

As the issues of Camp Sovereignty escalated, an Indigenous heritage inspector established a ‘thirty-day emergency protection order’ for the fire in Kings Domain, close to the Kings Domain Resting place. This meant the fire which had been identified as sacred could not be destroyed until 10 May 2006 to allow all parties to reach an optimal solution. The Black GST group were unable to extend the protection order past the original date of 10 May 2006, following a rejection from the authorities. This meant the fire in Kings Domain was inevitably extinguished and the camp was taken down. This enforcement led to the end of the official events of Camp Sovereignty which began as a temporary protest throughout the 2006 Commonwealth Games.

The work of the Black GST group continues throughout the 15 years after Camp Sovereignty, continuing to protest and build upon the events in 2006. Organisers and participants of the protests have frequently used Camp Sovereignty as a talking point to discuss their motives and work. This event had characterised the work of Indigenous Australian activists and specifically the Black GST group.

Robbie Thorpe's weekly podcast frequently refer back to Camp Sovereignty and how it has led to his future work as Australian Indigenous activists. These events have shaped the work of popular Indigenous activists such as Marg & Robbie Thorpe, Robert Corowa and Gary Foley making them well known to a wider audience and popular amongst Indigenous activist communities. While some within the community have criticised their work including several Elders, the events have been praised by many future activists and Indigenous leaders, referencing Camp Sovereignty as a point of inspiration for their work. Indigenous activist and politician Lidia Thorpe accredits the work of Robbie Thorpe including his contributions to Camp Sovereignty to her work in Indigenous representation claiming "Treaty would not be on the table today, if it wasn’t for my Uncle Rob".

The aftermath of Camp Sovereignty included future protests and sister fires to continue the message of Black GST. These events have had clear impacts on Indigenous Australian activism with similar protests at major sporting events drawing clear similarities. For example, the more recent Camp Freedom protest was a direct connection to the events of Camp Sovereignty, with a large protest at the 2018 Commonwealth Games on the Gold Coast. The protesters used the publicity of the 2018 Commonwealth Games to echo the concerns from Camp Sovereignty and continues to grow as a protest movement despite being shut down in 2006.

Media coverage 
The focus of Camp Sovereignty was to maximise media coverage of Indigenous civil rights issues on a national and international scale to create reform.

The Black GST group made media coverage the focus of the protest. This shaped the plans of Camp Sovereignty using one of the most notable and publicised Australian sporting events in the Commonwealth Games as a mode of protest. This aim extended across domestic and international media outlets with the group believing ‘the world should watch and judge Australia for its treatment of its First Nations people. The events drew headlines across mainstream media outlets including The Age and The Wire which show Camp Sovereignty to be a notable protest. The group attracted frequent headlines specifically from The Age which tracked the growth of Camp Sovereignty. During 2006, the coverage was constant with comments from various governments and the current Prime Minister, it was major at the time when there was uncertainty about when and how the camp would end.

The ABC have a podcast titled Shooting the Past which analyses an image from the past and dissects its meaning and discusses the significance of the events with relevant stakeholders. in 2019, the ABC dedicated an episode of its podcast Shooting the Past to focus on an image from Camp Sovereignty. The image analysed was taken by photographer Lisa Belair, depicting a shirtless Indigenous Australian man and a white police officer holding hands in the camp setting. The hosts attempt to dissect the events behind the image whether it was a moment of tension or more likely a possible connection and friendship amidst the tense situation.

The ABC also invited Robbie Thorpe to comprehensively describe the events of Camp Sovereignty as a primary witness 13 years later. Additionally, the ABC collaborated with Australian academics Richard Broome and Kim Krugar to provide historical backing and context explaining Camp Sovereignty in the podcast. The podcast revisits the events of Camp Sovereignty and is evidence of continued media coverage and discussion of the Camp Sovereignty movement more than a decade later.

Through continued podcasts, articles and further media coverage 15 years on from establishment, the Camp Sovereignty movement has continued to be referenced and acknowledged. Its continued publicity and lasting effects throughout the media are a testament to its credit as a protest movement by making media headlines and educating a wide audience nationally and internationally.

References

WikiNews: 2006 "Stolenwealth" Games to confront Commonwealth Games in Melbourne

Indigenous Australian politics
Separatism in Australia